Hyponephele pulchella is a butterfly species belonging to the family Nymphalidae. It is found from Turkestan to the western parts of the Himalayas and in Afghanistan.

References

pulchella
Butterflies of Asia
Butterflies described in 1867
Taxa named by Baron Cajetan von Felder
Taxa named by Rudolf Felder